Dakan was a short-lived mining town, now a ghost town, in western Douglas County, Colorado, United States, in the Front Range of the Rocky Mountains.

History
The town was founded in 1896 by prospector William Wanner, who announced that he had made a shipment of ore worth $35 per ton in silver and gold from his claim, and the Castle Rock Journal declared “The future of Dakan is assured.”.  By Christmas 1896, there were about 300 people in Dakan, and a United States post office opened in Dakan on December 30, 1896.

In January 1897 Dakan was described as having eight buildings, including hotel, restaurant, saloon, and grocery store, and contracts for five additional buildings as soon as lumber could be delivered.  But the ore did not live up to the hopes of the prospectors and promoters.  By August 1898 the post office was closed, and the town disappeared.

Geography

See also
List of ghost towns in Colorado

References

Ghost towns in Colorado
Former populated places in Douglas County, Colorado